Görcsöny is a village in Baranya county, Hungary. It was property of the Benyovszky family from the Middle Ages until 1945. Benyovszky Castle (kastely) is located near the village.

External links 
 Local statistics 

Populated places in Baranya County